Goronyo is a Local Government Area in Sokoto State, Nigeria. Its headquarters are in the town of Goronyo, on the Sokoto River. It has an area of 1,704 km and a population of 182,296 at the 2006 census.
The postal code of the area is 842.

The LGA is the location of the Goronyo Dam, upstream of Goronyo town to the east.

References

Local Government Areas in Sokoto State